Eric Marsh may refer to:

 Eric Marsh (cricketer, born 1920) (1920–2003), English cricketer
 Eric Marsh (cricketer, born 1940) (1940–2017), English first-class cricketer and educator